Gabriela Gaja Cover (born March 5, 1972) is a retired female butterfly swimmer from Mexico. She represented her native country at the 1992 Summer Olympics in Barcelona, Spain. There, she ended up in 17th place (4:26.73) in the Women's 4 × 100 m Medley Relay event, alongside Heike Koerner (backstroke), Ana Mendoza (breaststroke), and Laura Sánchez (freestyle).

References
 

1972 births
Living people
Mexican female swimmers
Female butterfly swimmers
Swimmers at the 1987 Pan American Games
Swimmers at the 1991 Pan American Games
Swimmers at the 1992 Summer Olympics
Olympic swimmers of Mexico
Pan American Games bronze medalists for Mexico
Pan American Games medalists in swimming
Central American and Caribbean Games gold medalists for Mexico
Central American and Caribbean Games medalists in swimming
Competitors at the 1990 Central American and Caribbean Games
Medalists at the 1991 Pan American Games
20th-century Mexican women